Todd Lamirande is a Canadian video journalist. He is a member of the Métis Nation,  and was formerly a co-host of APTN National News,  aired by the Aboriginal Peoples Television Network (APTN) and a host and co-producer of APTN Investigates.

Career
He currently hosts APTN: Nation to Nation, a half hour show focused on the politics of how Metis, Inuit and First Nations are rebuilding their relationship with Canada.
Lamirande first joined APTN in July 2000, working as a video journalist in APTN's Vancouver Bureau for four years before transferring to the Winnipeg Bureau and assuming the position of co-host.

2001 seizure of video equipment
Lamirande became mired in a controversy on June 24, 2001, when the Royal Canadian Mounted Police (RCMP) seized his vehicle and videotapes containing footage of  members of the Native Youth Movement as they protested the development of Sun Peaks Resort, a ski resort in Sun Peaks, British Columbia, 55 kilometers northeast of Kamloops. Lamirande had videotaped part of the confrontation, which later turned violent as protestors clashed with supporters of the project.

The actions of the RCMP outraged the Canadian Journalists for Free Expression (CJFE). CJFE Executive Director, Sharmini Peries, called the incident "an affront" to the integrity of journalists' materials, adding:

Lamirande commented that he felt racism was at play in the incident, noting that he doubted that the RCMP would have tried to seize the videotapes if he worked for the Canadian Broadcasting Corporation (CBC) or CTV Television Network.

APTN sought a court injunction to prevent the RCMP from using the videotapes as evidence.

References

External links
 

Canadian television journalists
Canadian Métis people
Living people
Year of birth missing (living people)
First Nations journalists